Iannarelli is an Italian surname. Notable people with the surname include:

Janine K. Iannarelli (born 1961), American businesswoman
Simone Iannarelli (born 1970), Italian composer and classical guitarist

Italian-language surnames